The GKD LEGEND is a light-weight performance sports car manufactured by British company GKD Sports Cars, based in Boughton Monchelsea, near Maidstone with workshops at Lenham. The LEGEND is available in component form, or fully built. It was the first seven inspired car on the market using BMW E36/46 running gear.

History 
The GKD LEGEND was a byproduct of the work to convert the GKD EVOLUTION to BMW donor parts. Creator Peter Lathrope saw a gap in the market for a BMW based seven and developed the LEGEND. After its first show preview at Exeter kit car show the press hailed the car as "the next big thing" in the kit car market as most of the Lotus Seven Style cars are still Ford Sierra based. After the success of the initial Legend GKD Sports Cars bridged the gap between the Legend and the Evolution by introducing a new variant known as the Legend six. This model is a slightly longer chassis to accommodate the BMW straight 6 engine and running gear but still keeping the classic 7 style.

Car components
The car uses a donor pack from a BMW 3 Series. The donor pack includes differential, half-shafts, brakes, steering column and lower steering shaft and if required, engine and gearbox. The chassis comes with BMW engine mounts already welded to the chassis to ease fitment.

Kits start at around £2,995, with an estimated build price from £8,000 (as of late 2008).
 Price list

Fully built cars are also supplied to foreign markets, countering crash test requirements. Prices start at around £10,500, with the donor pack left to the customer to source. Or GKD can supply all the donor pack components to order.

The body shell is made from GRP fibreglass, with a bespoke chassis housing the engine and suspension.

Example cars
The LEGEND can utilise most engines. The chart below indicates performance with a BMW E46 1.8 with different states of tune. Also including the Legend six with the E46 M3 engine and running gear

External links
 GKD Sports Cars
 Which Kit Car magazine

Cars of England